Frits is a masculine given name and also a diminutive form (hypocorism) of Frederik (or Frederick, Fredericus, Frederikus). Quite common in the Netherlands, it also occurs in Denmark and Norway. It may refer to:

 Frits Agterberg (born 1936), Dutch-born Canadian geologist
 Frederik Frits Korthals Altes (born 1931), Dutch politician and former Minister of Justice
 Frits Bernard (1920–2006), Dutch clinical psychologist and sexologist
 Frits Beukers (born 1953), Dutch mathematician
 Frits van Bindsbergen (born 1960), Dutch road cyclist
 Frits Bolkestein (born 1933), Dutch politician
 Frits Bülow (1872–1955), Danish politician and Justice Minister
 Frits Castricum (1947–2011), Dutch journalist and Labour Party politician
 Frits Clausen (1893–1947), Danish collaborator with Nazi Germany
 Frits Dantuma (born 1992), Dutch footballer
 Frits van Dongen (born 1946), Dutch architect
 Frits Dragstra (1927–2015), Dutch politician
 Frits Eijken (1893–1978), Dutch rower
 Frits Fentener van Vlissingen (1882–1962), Dutch businessman and entrepreneur
 Frits Goedgedrag (born 1951), first Governor of Curaçao and former Governor of the Netherlands Antilles
 Frits Goldschmeding (born 1933), Dutch businessman
 Frits Hansen (1841–1911), Norwegian educator, newspaper editor, biographer and politician
 Frits Hartvigson (1841–1919), Danish pianist and teacher
 Frits Heide (1883–1957), Danish botanist and science writer
 Frits Helmuth (1931–2004), Danish film actor
 Frits Henningsen (1889–1965), Danish furniture designer and cabinet maker
 Frederik David Holleman (1887–1958), Dutch and South African ethnologist and jurist
 Frits Holm (1881–1930), Danish scholar and adventurer
 Frits Hoogerheide (born 1944), Dutch racing cyclist
 Frits Janssens (1898–?), Belgian wrestler who competed in the 1920, 1924 and 1928 Olympics
 Frits Kemp (born 1954) is a Dutch attorney, receiver and activist
 Frits Kiggen (born 1955), Dutch sidecarcross passenger
 Frits Korthals Altes (born 1931), Dutch Minister of Justice
 Frederik Kortlandt (born 1946), Dutch linguistics professor
 Frits Kuipers (1899–1943), Dutch footballer, rower and physician
 Frederik Lamp (1905–1945), Dutch sprinter
 Frits Landesbergen (born 1961), Dutch jazz drummer and vibraphonist
 Frits von der Lippe (1901–1988), Norwegian journalist and theatre director
 Frits Lugt (1884–1970), Dutch collector of Dutch drawings and prints and authority on Rembrandt
 Frits Meuring 1882–1973), Dutch swimmer
 Frits Mulder, Belgian sailor at the 1928 Summer Olympics 
 Frederik Muller (1817–1881), Dutch bibliographer, book seller, and print collector
 Frits Niessen (1936–2020), Dutch politician
 Frits van Oostrom (born 1953), Dutch historic philologist
 Frits van Paasschen (born 1961), Dutch and American chief executive
 Frits Pannekoek (born 1947), Canadian historian and university dean
 Frits Peutz (1896–1974), Dutch architect
 Frits Philips (1905–2005), Dutch chairman of Philips electronics and Righteous Among the Nations
 Frits Pirard (born 1954), Dutch retired professional road bicycle racer
 Frits Poelman (born ca. 1930), Dutch-born New Zealand footballer
 Frits Potgieter (born 1974), South African retired discus thrower and shot putter
 Frits Purperhart (1944–2016), Surinamese football player and manager
 Frits de Ruijter (1917–2012), Dutch middle-distance runner
 Frits Ruimschotel (1922–1987), Dutch water polo player
 Frits Schalij (born 1957), Dutch retired speed skater
 Frits Schlegel (1896–1965), Danish architect
 Frederik Carl Gram Schrøder (1866–1936), Danish civil servant
 Frits Schuitema (born 1944), Dutch chief executive and football director
 Frits Schutte (1897–1986), Dutch swimmer
 Frits Schür (born 1954), Dutch retired cyclist
 Frits Sins (born 1964), Dutch slalom canoer
 Frits Smol (1924–2006), Dutch water polo player
 Frits Soetekouw (born 1938), Dutch footballer
 Frits Staal (1930–2012), Dutch Indologist
 Frits Tellegen (1919–2020), Dutch urban designer
 Frits Thaulow (1847–1906), Norwegian Impressionist painter
 Frits Thors (1909–2014), Dutch journalist and news anchor
 Frits van Turenhout (1913–2004), Dutch sports journalist
 Frits Van den Berghe (1883–1939), Belgian expressionist and surrealist painter and illustrator
 Frits Vanen (born 1933), Dutch painter and sculptor
 Frederik Vermehren (1823–1910), Danish genre and a portrait painter
 Frits Went (1863–1935), Dutch botanist, father of Frits Warmolt Went
 Frits Warmolt Went (1903–1990), Dutch biologist and botanist
 Frits Zernike (1888–1966), Dutch physicist and Nobel Prize winner

See also
 Fritz, another given name

Dutch masculine given names
Hypocorisms